...Like a Bolt of Lightning is the first release by Juliette and the Licks. It was released on October 12, 2004.

Track listing

Personnel
Bass, backing bocals [background] – Paul Ill
Drums – Jason Morris, Patty Schemel
Engineer [Pro Tools] – David Guerrero
Guitar – Clint Walsh
Guitar, backing vocals [background] – Kemble Walters, Todd Morse
Mastered by – Brian "Big Bass" Gardner
Mixed by – Bernd Burgdorf
Photography by – RJ Shaughnessy
Producer – H. Rhodes
Technician [engineer] – Andrew Chavez
Vocals – Juliette Lewis

References 

Juliette and the Licks EPs
2004 debut EPs
Fiddler Records EPs
2004 debut albums